Noir is a Canadian drama film, directed by Yves Christian Fournier and released in 2015.

An ensemble cast film set primarily in the impoverished Montreal North area, the film focuses on a variety of interconnected storylines. Characters include Dickens (Kémy St-Eloi) and Bobby (Clauter Alexandre), two Haitian Canadian brothers involved in the gang lifestyle; Kadhafi (Salim Kechiouche), an Algerian immigrant who works in a dry cleaning shop with Jean-Jacques (Benz Antoine) and dreams of becoming a hip hop star; and Suzie (Jade-Mariuka Robitaille), a stripper in a relationship with drug dealer Evans (Christopher Charles) while simultaneously connected in an ambiguous way to Phil (Patrick Hivon).

Kechiouche garnered a Jutra Award nomination for Best Supporting Actor at the 18th Jutra Awards.

References

External links
 

2015 films
2015 drama films
Canadian drama films
Quebec films
Black Canadian films
Films set in Montreal
Films shot in Montreal
French-language Canadian films
2010s Canadian films